Camptoloma vanata is a moth of the subfamily Arctiinae. It is found in Jiangxi and Hainan in China and in northern Vietnam.

External links
 , 2005: Two new species of the genus Camptoloma (Lepidoptera: Noctuidae) from China. Florida Entomologist 88(1): 34-37. Full article: 

Arctiinae